Ray Dunster (11 October 1908 – 18 March 1968) was a New Zealand cricketer. He played in two first-class matches for Canterbury in 1932/33.

See also
 List of Canterbury representative cricketers

References

External links
 

1908 births
1968 deaths
New Zealand cricketers
Canterbury cricketers
Cricketers from Christchurch